Charles Joseph McGettigan (born 7 December 1950, Ballyshannon, County Donegal) is an Irish singer. He lives in Drumshanbo, Co. Leitrim.

Career
Performing with Paul Harrington, he won the Eurovision Song Contest 1994 with the song "Rock 'n' Roll Kids" (words and music by Brendan Graham). Harrington played piano and McGettigan played guitar. He made an appearance as a guest singer at Congratulations, the 50th anniversary concert of Eurovision.

In August 1998, McGettigan's only son, Shane McGettigan, was killed in a construction accident while working in Quincy, Massachusetts.

In 2015, McGettigan wrote "Anybody Got a Shoulder?" for Kat Mahon, which was one of the five songs in Eurosong 2015, the national selection to select the Irish entry for Ireland in the Eurovision Song Contest 2015. The song finished 2nd.

Discography

Albums
Songs of the Night (And Other Stories) (1986)
Charlie McGettigan (1990)
Rock 'N' Roll Kids - The Album (together with Paul Harrington) (1994)
In Your Old Room (1998)
Another Side of Charlie McGettigan (c. 2002)
Stolen Moments (2006)
The Man from 20 (2010)
Some Old Someone (Stockfisch, 2019)

References

External links

1950 births
Living people
Eurovision Song Contest entrants of 1994
Eurovision Song Contest winners
Eurovision Song Contest entrants for Ireland
Irish male singers
Irish pop singers
People from Ballyshannon
Musicians from County Leitrim
People from Drumshanbo
Stockfisch Records artists